Bjørn Erik Thon (born 6 February 1964) is a Norwegian jurist and ombudsman.

Career
He graduated as cand.jur. in 1989. From 1999 to 2000, during the first cabinet Bondevik Thon worked as a political advisor in the Ministry of Justice and the Police. He has been a member of Grefsen-Kjelsås borough council for the Liberal Party. From 2000 to 2010, he headed the office of the Norwegian Consumer Ombudsman. His period was renewed in 2007. He succeeded Georg Apenes as director of the Norwegian Data Inspectorate in late May 2010, though his immediate predecessor was acting director Ove Skåra.

Ombudsman of Gender Equality and Anti-Discrimination
On 19 November 2021, he was nominated to succeed Hanne Bjurstrøm as ombudsman of the Gender Equality and Anti-Discrimination Ombud. He became the first man to hold the position. He assumes office on 28 February 2022.

In July 2022, Thon argued that the incident of a woman of Russian woman not being granted a job interview due to her nationality, was a clear example of discrimination. He also emphasised that it was important to differentiate between the Russian state and individual Russian citizens. He was supported by lawyer Henriette Willix from Advokatfirmaet Sulland.

Writing
In 2000, he started his career as a writer with his crime novel Svart kappe. He followed with the crime novels Den tause klienten in 2002 and Den enes død in 2004. In 2005 he wrote the consumer issues book Forbrukerjungelboka with Ola Fæhn.

References

1964 births
Living people
Norwegian jurists
Directors of government agencies of Norway
Norwegian crime fiction writers
Norwegian non-fiction writers
Ombudsmen in Norway
Liberal Party (Norway) politicians
Politicians from Oslo